Cloone is a townland in the civil parish of Loughmoe East, County Tipperary, Ireland. It is located southeast of Templemore.

References

Townlands of County Tipperary